Chilo thyrsis is a moth in the family Crambidae. It was described by Stanisław Błeszyński in 1963. It is found in Tanzania.

The larvae have been reported feeding on Zea mays.

References

Chiloini
Moths described in 1963